Sharafi may refer to:
Sharafi, Iran, a village in Khuzestan Province, Iran
Amir Sharafi (b. 1991), Iranian footballer
Asghar Sharafi (b. 1942), Iranian football coach
Jalal Sharafi, Iranian diplomat; see Kidnapping of Jalal Sharafi
Kalim Sharafi (1924–2010), Bangladeshi singer